NRK Aktivum was created in 1997 as a wholly owned subsidiary of the Norwegian Broadcasting Corporation (NRK) to take care of NRK's commercial activities. NRK Aktivum develop and sell products, services and rights based on NRK's program production and brands.

They offer DVDs, music, books, audiobooks and licensed products from NRK's program archives and ongoing production of television, radio and online. They also sell billboards to sponsor on television, they have an event department, as well as an offer to visitors Marienlyst with a visitor center and guided tours.

The company as of 2012 has 25 employees, and its 2011 revenue was approximately  130 million Norwegian krone.

References

NRK
1997 establishments in Norway
Companies established in 1997
Companies based in Oslo